Paddy "Sweeper" Ryan (1 April 1912 – 31 December 1991) was an Irish hurler who played as a left corner-forward for the Tipperary senior team.

Ryan made his first appearance for the team during the 1934 championship and was a regular member of the starting fifteen until his retirement after the 1945 championship. During that time he won two All-Ireland medals and one Munster medal.

At club level Hayes was a five-time county championship medalist with Moycarkey–Borris.

References

External links
Reference to the "late Paddy Ryan"

1912 births
1991 deaths
All-Ireland Senior Hurling Championship winners
Moycarkey-Borris hurlers
Tipperary inter-county hurlers